Laremy Alexander Tunsil (born August 2, 1994) is an American football offensive tackle for the Houston Texans of the National Football League (NFL). He played college football at Ole Miss.

High school career 
A native of Lake City, Florida, Tunsil attended Columbia High School, where he played football and competed in track and field as a shot putter. He was a two-time All-State offensive lineman for the Tigers football team. Tunsil credits his development as an offensive tackle to going up against defensive lineman Timmy Jernigan, his Columbia teammate, in practice. "He's always trying to get better every day. He's strong and he's fundamentally sound. He's got all the tools you need to be one of the best," said his high school coach Brian Allen. In his senior year, Tunsil helped Columbia High School rush for 275 yards per game en route to the FHSAA Class 6A state quarterfinals, where they lost 28–21 to Navarre High School. After the season, Tunsil played in the 2013 U.S. Army All-American Bowl.

Regarded as a five-star recruit by Rivals.com, Tunsil was listed as the highest ranked offensive tackle prospect of his class. Tunsil had offers from every major BCS program, including every SEC school. From early on, he made depth chart, i.e. the possibility of starting as a true freshman, one of his priorities. He eliminated his home-state Florida Gators early in the process, because the Gators had signed five-star offensive tackle D. J. Humphries from the previous class. For a long period of time, Tunsil was believed to be leaning towards Georgia, since the Bulldogs started true freshman John Theus at right tackle in every game of the 2012 season, and Tunsil hoped to do so at left tackle in 2013 as incumbent starter Kenarious Gates was graduating. But after a visit to Ole Miss in late January, Tunsil reportedly changed his mind and was considered a "done deal" for the Rebels. Tunsil made his announcement on National Signing Day on ESPNU, where he indeed committed to Ole Miss.

College career 
At Ole Miss in 2013, Tunsil played every game, starting all but four games—Vanderbilt, Southeast Missouri State, Alabama, and Auburn. He was one of only two true freshmen serving as his team's full-time starting left tackle, the other being Virginia Tech's Jonathan McLaughlin. Tunsil had his first start against Texas, competing against Longhorns defensive end Jackson Jeffcoat, who finished the game with only three tackles and no sacks. Following the Rebels' 34–24 victory over SEC West rival Arkansas, Tunsil was named SEC Offensive Lineman of the Week, after helping the offense piling up 531 total yards and a near-school record 428 passing yards. Tunsil earned SEC All-Freshman honors by the league's coaches, and first-team Freshman All-American honors by The Sporting News, after allowing only one sack throughout his freshman season.

As a sophomore, started at the left tackle position in all 11 games that he played in, only missing the Auburn and Presbyterian games due to a partially torn bicep. Tunsil was back in the starting line-up for the Peach Bowl, but fractured his fibula in the first half when quarterback Bo Wallace fell on the back of his right leg. After the season, Tunsil was named All-SEC by the Associated Press.

In June 2015, before his junior season, Tunsil was accused by his stepfather, Lindsey Miller, of having accepted improper benefits from sports agents. Coach Hugh Freeze decided to bench Tunsil for the season-opener against Tennessee–Martin on September 5, as a “precautionary measure.” Tunsil was suspended by the NCAA and missed the first seven games of the season.  He was reinstated before the #15 Texas A&M game on October 24. His matchup with defensive end Myles Garrett, who entered the game with  quarterback sacks, was highly anticipated. According to analysts Tunsil emerged as “the big winner,” not giving up a sack and helping the Rebels to a 23–3 upset win over the Aggies. Having missed the first half of the season, Tunsil was not selected to any All-American team despite solid performance. During the Sugar Bowl game against Oklahoma State, Tunsil had a two-yard rushing touchdown as time expired in the first half. Ole Miss won the Sugar Bowl, 48–20.

Professional career 

Shortly after Ole Miss's bowl game, Tunsil announced his decision to forgo his final college year and enter the 2016 NFL Draft. In February, a number of mock drafts projected him to be the No. 1 overall selection by the Tennessee Titans. NFL Media analyst Lance Zierlein compared Tunsil to All-Pro offensive tackle Tyron Smith. After an outstanding performance in offensive line drills at the NFL Combine, Tunsil further established himself as the No. 1 draft prospect. On April 14, the Titans announced a trade of their first overall draft pick to the Los Angeles Rams, who were widely believed to be looking for a quarterback rather than an offensive lineman, and eventually selected quarterback Jared Goff out of California.

Ten minutes before the draft was set to begin, Tunsil's Twitter account showed a video of him wearing a gas mask and smoking a substance from a bong. Although Tunsil's agent Jimmy Sexton immediately explained that the account was hacked, it resulted in some teams taking Tunsil off their draft boards entirely. The Baltimore Ravens (at No. 6) and Tennessee Titans (at No. 8), both in need of an offensive tackle, passed over Tunsil and chose Ronnie Stanley and Jack Conklin, respectively. The Miami Dolphins eventually selected him with the 13th overall pick. In a parallel incident, Tunsil's Instagram account published a screenshot of a text requesting money from Ole Miss assistant athletic director John Miller for rent and so Tunsil's mother could pay her electric bill. During a post-draft press conference, Tunsil admitted that he took money from an Ole Miss coach while a member of the school, but explained his Instagram account had also been hacked.

Miami Dolphins
On April 28, 2016, the Miami Dolphins selected Tunsil with the 13th overall selection in the 2016 NFL Draft. He was the highest selected offensive lineman for the Dolphins since Jake Long went first overall in 2008, and the highest drafted Ole Miss player since linebacker Patrick Willis went 11th overall to the San Francisco 49ers in 2007. On May 6, 2016, it was announced that Tunsil had signed a $12.45 million, four-year contract with the Dolphins. As a rookie in the 2016 season, Tunsil played in 14 games, 13 of those at the left guard position. He helped the Dolphins to finish with the ninth best rushing offense in the league. After the 2016 season, veteran left tackle Branden Albert was traded to the Jacksonville Jaguars, making room for Tunsil to move to the left tackle position for the 2017 season. In the 2017 season, Tunsil appeared in and started 15 games. In the 2018 season, Tunsil appeared in and started 15 games once again.

On April 18, 2019, the Dolphins picked up the fifth-year option on Tunsil's contract.

Houston Texans
On August 31, 2019, Tunsil, Kenny Stills, and a fourth-round pick were traded to the Houston Texans in exchange for two first-round picks, a second-round pick, Johnson Bademosi, and Julien Davenport. He started 14 games at left tackle in 2019, earning his first trip to the Pro Bowl. He was ranked 66th by his fellow players on he NFL Top 100 Players of 2020.

On April 24, 2020, Tunsil signed a three-year, $66 million contract extension with $57.85 million guaranteed with the Texans, making him the highest-paid offensive lineman in terms of annual value. He played in and started 14 games in the 2020 season. He earned his second Pro Bowl nomination in 2020. He was ranked 75th by his fellow players on he NFL Top 100 Players of 2021.

On October 16, 2021, Tunsil was placed on injured reserve after undergoing thumb surgery. In the 2021 season, Tunsil appeared in and started five games.

On March 19, 2023, Tunsil re-signed to the Texans on a three year, $75 million contract extension.

NFL career statistics

Personal life 
Tunsil was arrested on domestic violence charges in Oxford, Mississippi, after an altercation with his step-father Lindsey Miller on June 25, 2015. Miller claimed the incident stemmed from an argument about Tunsil "riding around with agents," while others claimed Tunsil acted in defense of his mother. Later, Miller met with Chris Howard, the NCAA's director of enforcement, accusing Tunsil of NCAA rules violations, which triggered an NCAA investigation that resulted in Tunsil's suspension for the first seven games of his junior season at Ole Miss (see above).

References

External links 

Houston Texans bio
Ole Miss Rebels bio

1994 births
Living people
People from Lake City, Florida
People from Harvey, Louisiana
Players of American football from Florida
African-American players of American football
American football offensive tackles
American football offensive guards
Ole Miss Rebels football players
Miami Dolphins players
Houston Texans players
American Conference Pro Bowl players
21st-century African-American sportspeople